The 1967 Washington Whips season was the club's first season of existence, participating in the United Soccer Association (USA), which, at the time, was the top division of American soccer. The Whips were an imported team of Aberdeen F.C. of Scotland. They won the USA's Eastern Division and played the Los Angeles Wolves for the title. A coin toss placed the game in Los Angeles, where the Whips, after playing with 10 players for the last 30 minutes, lost on an own goal scored in extra time by Ally Shewan.

Club

Roster

Team management

Competitions

United Soccer Association

Standings 

The Whips played the Los Angeles Wolves on June 20, a game that ended in a tie. But the Whips protested because the Wolves were allowed an illegal substitution. On July 6, the commissioner upheld the protest, the game was vacated and a "do-over" was played on July 10. Washington won that match 3-0 thereby winning the division.

Results summary

Results by round

Match results 

Source

USA Championship

Statistics

Transfers

See also 
 1966–67 Aberdeen F.C. season
 1967–68 Aberdeen F.C. season
 1967 in American soccer
 United Soccer Association
 Washington Whips
 Washington Darts
 Washington Diplomats
 D.C. United

References 

1967
Washington Whips
Washington Whips
Washing Washington, D.C.